Forsalebyowner.com is the United States largest "by owner" real estate website.  It provides a real estate advertising and information service that charges a flat fee to property owners who advertise their property on the company’s Website. It created a business model that competed directly with traditional real estate firms, connecting buyers and sellers without the use of brokers.  Property sellers devise and customize the content and format of their advertisement.  ForSaleByOwner.com then charged to the owners a listing fee that is directly proportional to the length of the advertisement and the period of time it appears on its Web site. For an additional fee, property owners can have also list their properties on the MLS with a real estate agent affiliated with ForSaleByOwner.com. Interested buyers can use the service to search listed properties for free.  However, ForSaleByOwner.com does not represent or negotiate on behalf of either the seller or the buyer.  On its Website, a disclaimer clearly states that it is not a real estate agent and is legally prohibited from taking part in the actual sales transaction.

History

In 1999, Damon Giglio founded ForSaleByOwner.com in New York. Within five years, it became the country’s biggest commission-free real-estate bazaar. Between 1999 and 2010, ForSaleByOwner.com saved home sellers more than one billion dollars in brokers' commissions.  In 2010 alone, ForSaleByOwner.com facilitated sales of $1.8 billion worth of residential real estate.  Based on 6% commission fee structure, the saving translated into at least $72 million.

In early 2000, California enacted laws that required websites that advertised properties for sale to obtain a broker’s license. In 2003, ForSaleByOwner.com challenged the California’s State Real Estate Licensing Laws in court as a violation of the First Amendment.  On behalf of ForSaleByOwner.com, lead counsel Steve Simpson, from the non-profit "public interest" law firm the Institute for Justice, filed a federal lawsuit in Sacramento. In the lawsuit, For SaleByOwner.com v. Zinneman, Steve Simpson challenged the state of California, stating the requirement for Internet advertising companies to be licensed real estate brokers violated the 1st Amendment.  The Institute feels their client ForSaleByOwner.com "simply provides an advertising platform and information to homeowners for a flat fee, empowering individuals to sell and purchase homes on their own". As newspapers showed classified ads to advertise homes without being licensed by the state, ForSaleByOwner.com should not be required to obtain a broker's license to show homes online.  Finding the licensing requirement "wholly arbitrary", the Federal District Court granted summary judgment in favor of the ForSaleByOwner.com.

ForSaleByOwner.com was acquired in 2006 by the Chicago Tribune and was based in Chicago before being sold to Rocket HomesSM in 2018.

References

External links
Trusted Home Buyer

American real estate websites
Online marketplaces of the United States
Real estate companies established in 1999
Tribune Publishing
Companies based in Chicago
Internet properties established in 1999
1999 establishments in Illinois